The year 1762 in architecture involved some significant events.

Events
King George III of the United Kingdom begins remodelling Buckingham Palace as his family's main London residence.
Construction of the Petit Trianon in the grounds of the Palace of Versailles in France to the design of Ange-Jacques Gabriel begins.
Construction of the Brick Market in Newport, Rhode Island, to the design of Peter Harrison begins (completed 1772).

Buildings and structures

Buildings

Milsom Street, Bath, England, is built by Thomas Lightholder.
Plymouth Synagogue in England, the oldest synagogue built by Ashkenazi Jews in the English-speaking world, is built, apparently without an architect.
St George's German Lutheran Church in London is built.
Old St. Thomas's Church, Dublin, Ireland, designed by John Smith after Palladio, is completed.
Old City Hall (Aalborg) in Denmark, built by Daniel Popp, is completed.
Old State House (Providence, Rhode Island) is substantially completed.
Faneuil Hall, Boston, Massachusetts, is rebuilt after a fire.
Richmond Place on the River Thames at Richmond, England, designed by Robert Taylor, is completed for Sir Charles Asgill.
Schuyler Mansion in Albany, New York, designed by John Gaborial, is completed.
Upton Scott House in Annapolis, Maryland, is built by William Brown.
Notre-Dame de Guebwiller is started (completed in 1785)

Publications
 James Stuart and Nicholas Revett's Antiquities of Athens.

Births
April 14 – Giuseppe Valadier, Italian architect and designer, urban planner and archeologist (died 1839)
September 20 – Pierre-François-Léonard Fontaine, French neoclassical architect, interior decorator and designer (died 1853)

Deaths
December 17? – Charles Labelye, Swiss civil engineer (born 1705)
date unknown – Rosario Gagliardi, Sicilian architect (born 1698)

References

Architecture
Years in architecture
18th-century architecture